Uithuizermeeden is a railway station located in Uithuizermeeden, The Netherlands. The station was opened on 16 August 1893 and is located on the Sauwerd–Roodeschool railway. The services are operated by Arriva.

Train service
The following services currently call at Uithuizermeeden:
2x per hour local service (stoptrein) Groningen - Roodeschool

References

External links
 Uithuizermeeden station, station information

Transport in Het Hogeland
Railway stations in Groningen (province)
Railway stations opened in 1893